The county of Gloucestershire
is divided into 6 parliamentary constituencies
- 2 borough constituencies
and 4 county constituencies.

Constituencies

2010 boundary changes

Under the Fifth Periodic Review of Westminster constituencies, the Boundary Commission for England decided to retain Gloucestershire's constituencies for the 2010 election, making minor changes to realign constituency boundaries with the boundaries of current local government wards, and to reduce the electoral disparity between constituencies. Although the changes were minor, the Cotswold constituency was renamed The Cotswolds.

Proposed boundary changes 
See 2023 Periodic Review of Westminster constituencies for further details.

Following the abandonment of the Sixth Periodic Review (the 2018 review), the Boundary Commission for England formally launched the 2023 Review on 5 January 2021. Initial proposals were published on 8 June 2021 and, following two periods of public consultation, revised proposals were published on 8 November 2022. Final proposals will be published by 1 July 2023.

The commission has proposed that Gloucestershire be combined with Wiltshire as a sub-region of the South West Region, with the creation of the cross-county boundary constituency of South Cotswolds, resulting in a major reconfiguration of existing constituency of The Cotswolds, which would be renamed North Cotswolds. The following seats are proposed:

Containing electoral wards from Cheltenham

 Cheltenham
 Tewkesbury (part)

Containing electoral wards in Cotswold

 North Cotswolds (part)
 South Cotswolds (part also in Witshire)

Containing electoral wards in Forest of Dean

 Forest of Dean (part)

Containing wards in Gloucester

 Gloucester
 Tewkesbury (part)

Containing wards in Stroud

 North Cotswolds (part)
 South Cotswolds (part)
 Stroud

Containing wards in Tewkesbury

 Forest of Dean (part)
 North Cotswolds (part)
 Tewkesbury (part)

Results history
Primary data source: House of Commons research briefing - General election results from 1918 to 2019

2019 
The number of votes cast for each political party who fielded candidates in constituencies comprising Gloucestershire in the 2019 general election were as follows:

Percentage votes 
Note that before 1983 Gloucestershire covered a wider and much more populous area than it does today, including the north of what became Avon and the city of Bristol.

1including National Liberal

21950-1979: Liberal Party; 1983 & 1987 - SDP-Liberal Alliance

* Included in Other

Accurate vote percentages cannot be obtained for the elections of 1918, 1923 and 1935 because at least one candidate stood unopposed.

Seats 

1including National Liberal

21950-1979: Liberal Party; 1983 & 1987 - SDP-Liberal Alliance

Maps

Historical representation by party
A cell marked → (with a different colour background to the preceding cell) indicates that the previous MP continued to sit under a new party name.

1885 to 1918

1918 to 1950

1950 to 1983

1983 to present

See also

 List of parliamentary constituencies in Avon for divisions in South Gloucestershire and Bristol.
 List of constituencies in South West England

Notes

References

Gloucestershire
Constituencies
 Gloucestershire
Parliament